Hao Yun (1925 – 10 June 2019) was a Chinese translator. Over a career spanning seven decades, he translated more than 60 works from French to Chinese. He was conferred the Lifetime Achievement Award in Translation by the Translators Association of China.

Biography 
Hao was born as Hao Liandong in 1925 in Nanchang, Jiangxi, Republic of China. He graduated from Department of French Literature of the Sino-French University, which was exiled in Kunming during the Second Sino-Japanese War, in 1946.

From 1947 to 1953 Hao worked for the Red Cross Society of China in Nanjing, Shanghai, and Beijing. After 1953, he worked as an editor at Pingming Publishing House and Shanghai Xinwenyi Publishing House. He resigned from his job in 1958 because of lung disease.

After his disease was cured, he dedicated himself to translating French literature into Chinese, and joined the Shanghai Translation Institute in 1961. From 1979 he worked at Shanghai Translation Publishing House. Over a career which lasted 70 years, he translated more than 60 French works, including The Red and the Black, The Charterhouse of Parma, The Black Tulip, Letters from My Windmill, and Selected Novels of Daudet. He was also an editor for French-Chinese Dictionary.

Hao was a member of the China Writers Association. In 2015, he was conferred the Lifetime Achievement Award in Translation by the Translators Association of China.

Hao died on 10 June 2019 at Renji Hospital in Shanghai, at the age of 94.

References 

1925 births
2019 deaths
People's Republic of China translators
French–Chinese translators
Writers from Jiangxi
People from Nanchang
20th-century translators